The 1963 Iraq Central FA Altruism Cup was the 2nd edition of the Iraq Central FA Perseverance Cup. The match was contested between the winners and runners-up of the 1962–63 edition of the Iraq Central FA League, Montakhab Al-Shorta and Al-Firqa Al-Thalitha respectively. Al-Firqa Al-Thalitha won the game 1–0.

Match

Details

References

External links
 Iraqi Football Website

Football competitions in Iraq